Hungry Bear Media is a British television production company founded in 2014 by Dan Baldwin and Juliet Denison-Gay.

History
In 2014, Hungry Bear Media was founded by television executive Dan Baldwin and television executive Juliet Denison-Gay.

In January 2015, the company entered a first-look deal with distributor Sky Vision, a subsidiary of Sky.

Filmography

In development
 Family Assemble (TBA)
 Gladiators (2023)

Current
 Michael McIntyre's Big Show (2015–2019, 2023–present)
 Bradley Walsh & Son: Breaking Dad (2019–present)
 The Wheel (2020–present)
 Freeze the Fear with Wim Hof (2022–present)
 Munya and Filly Get Chilly (2022–present)

Former
 Dapper Laughs: On the Pull (2014)
 Virtually Famous (with Talkback) (2014–2017) 
 Reality Bites (2015)
 1000 Heartbeats (2015–2016)
 Play to the Whistle (2015–2017)
 Alan Carr's Happy Hour (with Travesty Media) (2016)
 FHM: The Last of the Lads' Mags (2016)
 Debatable (2016–2017)
 All Round to Mrs. Brown's (with BOC-PIX) (2017–2020)
 Whiplashed (2018)
 The Greatest TV Moments of All Time (2018)
 For Facts Sake (with BOC-PIX) (2018)
 Judge Romesh (2018–2019)
 Re-Play 2018 with Richard Osman (with Mitre Television) (2018)
 Romesh's Look Back To The Future (2018–2019)
 Bradley Walsh's Late Night Guestlist (2019)
 Take Off with Bradley & Holly (2019, 2021)
 Michael McIntyre: Showman (2020)

References

External links
 Hungry Bear Media – Official website
 Hungry Bear Media on British Comedy Guide

British companies established in 2014
Mass media companies established in 2014
Television production companies of the United Kingdom

Companies based in the London Borough of Hammersmith and Fulham
Mass media companies based in London